Cem is a male given name.

Cem (1459-1495), Ottoman prince
Cem Atan (born 1985), Austrian footballer
Cem Boyner (born 1955), Turkish businessman and short-time politician
Cem Demir (born 1985), Turkish footballer
Cem Kaner, American academic
Cem Karaca, (1945–2004), Turkish musician
Cem Kızıltuğ (born 1974), Turkish artist
Cem Özdemir (born 1965), German politician of Turkish descent
Cem Pamiroğlu (born 1957), Turkish footballer
Cem Yılmaz (born 1973), Turkish stand-up comedian
Cem Yılmaz (rower) (born 1982), Turkish Olympian rower

Anglicized version Jem
Jem Karacan (born 1989), English footballer

Turkish masculine given names